Grand Union may refer to:

Transport
 Grand union, a four-way, double track rail junction often found on tram systems
 Grand Union Canal, a canal running from London to Birmingham in England
 Grand Union Canal (old), a former canal in England, now forms a branch of the bigger Grand Union Canal
 Grand Central (train operating company), a train operating company in England that at one stage proposed trading as Grand Union Railway
 Grand Union (train operating company), a prospective train operating company

Entertainment
 Grand Union Orchestra, a London world jazz ensemble
Grand Union (dance group), a former New York dance group
 Grand Union (Firebird album), 2009
 Grand Union (Frank Tovey album), 1991

Other uses
 Grand Union Flag, the first flag of the United States
 Grand Union of 1256
 Grand Union (supermarket), an American supermarket chain
 Grand Union (short story collection), a 2019 short story collection by Zadie Smith

See also
 Grand Junction (disambiguation)